Frank A. Oftring, Jr. (June 4, 1924 – October 4, 1982) was an American college basketball player and coach.  He played on Holy Cross' 1947 National Championship team and later returned to campus as the school's head coach from 1961 to 1965.

After concluding his high school career in June 1942 at Brooklyn Technical High School, Oftring joined the United States Navy during World War II, stationed primarily at Quonset Point Naval Air Station in Rhode Island.  Following his service, he joined Doggie Julian's Holy Cross team and was a forward on their 1947 championship team with future Hall of Fame guard Bob Cousy.  After his career, Oftring was drafted in the 8th round of the 1950 NBA Draft by the Boston Celtics, though he never played in the NBA.

Following a stint coaching high school basketball, Oftring became Holy Cross' head basketball coach in 1961.  He left after four seasons with a record of 64–33 and started a brokerage firm.

Oftring died on October 4, 1982.  He was inducted into the New England Basketball Hall of Fame in 2009.

References

1924 births
1982 deaths
Basketball coaches from New York (state)
Basketball players from New York City
Boston Celtics draft picks
High school basketball coaches in the United States
Holy Cross Crusaders men's basketball coaches
Holy Cross Crusaders men's basketball players
Sportspeople from Brooklyn
American men's basketball players
Brooklyn Preparatory School alumni
United States Navy personnel of World War II